The 1998 Copa Libertadores group stage was played from 25 February to 9 April 1998. A total of 20 teams competed in the group stage to decide 15 places in the final stages of the 1998 Copa Libertadores, where they joined defending champions Cruzeiro.

Groups composition
Same as previous editions, the 20 participating teams were divided into 5 groups of 4, which consisted of two teams from one association and two teams from another. The paired associations for this edition were as follows:

Group 1:  and 
Group 2:  and 
Group 3:  and 
Group 4:  and 
Group 5:  and 

However, after the agreement reached between the Venezuelan Football Federation (FVF) and Mexican promoters close to the Mexican Football Federation (FMF), the two places corresponding to the FVF were put at stake in a previous tournament, called Pre-Libertadores, between the two Venezuelan teams that had previously qualified for this edition and two Mexican teams designated by the FMF. Mexican sides Guadalajara and Club América overcame Venezuelan sides Caracas and Atlético Zulia to qualify for group 2.

Format

In the group stage, each group was played on a home-and-away round-robin basis. The teams were ranked according to the following criteria: 1. Points (3 points for a win, 1 point for a draw, and 0 points for a loss); 2. Goal difference; 3. Goals scored.

The winners, runners-up and third placed teams of each group advanced to the round of 16 of the final stages.

Schedule
The match schedule of the group stage was announced by CONMEBOL on 12 December 1997.

Groups

Group 1

Group 2

Group 3

Group 4

Group 5

References

External links
Copa Libertadores de América 1998, at RSSSF.org

March 1998 sports events in South America
April 1998 sports events in South America